Rayaprolu Subbarao (1892–1984) was among the pioneers of modern Telugu literature. He is known as Abhinava Nannaya. He was recipient of Sahitya Akademi Award to Telugu Writers for his poetic work Misra Manjari in 1965. He was inspired by the Western literary movement and brought romanticism into Telugu literature by breaking away from the traditional translations of Sanskrit literature. He introduced the concept of "Amalina Shringara Tatvamu" into Telugu literature.

Early life
Rao was born in Garlapadu village, Kakumanu Mandal, Guntur district. His maternal uncle, Avvari Subramanya Sastri, initially taught him Sanskrit and Telugu. He attended the Board High School in Bapatla and was later educated in Kakinada and Rajahmundry.

He assisted Komarraju Venkata Lakshmana Rao in the preparation of Andhra Vignana Sarvasvamu.

Department of Telugu in Osmania University, Hyderabad was started in 1919. He was the professor and head of this department for 25 years. Khandavalli Lakshmi Ranjanam, Divakarla Venkata Avadhani, B. Rama Raju  and C. Narayana Reddy were associated with him as faculty.

He was the chief editor of Andhra Maha Bhagavatam published by Telugu Academi, Hyderabad.

Style

Subbarao's literature is a mixture of Telugu Indian culture and Western ideas. He brought Western romanticism especially English lyric style to Telugu literature. However, he followed classical Sanskrit and Telugu meter in his writings and he didn't abandon Sanskrit Telugu form common language. His literature themes include sensual material, love of nature, patriotism, spirituality, humanitarianism and social reforms. Sensuality, in general, may be divided into two kinds, union and separation. Rayaprolu preferred separation in his writings. In his first independent poem, Trunakankanamu, Rayaprolu narrates love pangs of separation. The hero's lover marries another man and he remains unmarried to suffer from the memories. By the end of the poem, hero's love transforms into a platonic love and friendship. In this poem, Rayaprolu's heroin continues a platonic relationship with the hero while married to another man. In Kastakamala, Kamala loves (platonic) two men. However, when one of them writes a love letter, she commits suicide. Rayaprolu was a great patriot and Telugu nationalist. He praised the (past) greatness of Telugu warriors to awaken the sleeping Telugu pride. Rayaprolu Subbarao defined Telugu romanticism and began a new era in Telugu literature. His romantic literature is considered as the watershed in Telugu literature for its modernity of themes such as naturalism, rural life, platonic love, a sense of history, libertarianism, patriotism, and fierce nationalism.

Edesamegina Endukalidina
His poem "Edesamegina Endukalidina is very popular.

Honours
 Sri Rayaprolu Subba Rao was awarded Kalaprapoorna from Andhra University in 1977.
 Sri Rayaprolu Subba Rao was awarded Sahitya Akademi Award in 1965.

Works

Translations
 Anumati (Permission)
 Bhaja Govindamu (Prayer to Govinda) (Telugu translation of Shankaracharya's Bhaja Govindham)
 Soundarya Lahari (Below of Beauty) (Telugu translation of Shankaracharya's Soundarya Lahari)
 Sundara Kanda (Beauty Section) (Telugu translation of Valmiki Ramayana)
 Dootha Mattebhamu (Messenger Elephant)
 Lalitha (Telugu translation of The Hermit of [Oliver Goldsmith])
 Madhukalasamu (Liquor Pitcher) (Telugu rendering of Rubaiyat of Omar Khayyam)
 Meghaduta (Telugu translation of Kalidasa's work)
 Uttararama Charitha (Telugu translation of Bhavabhuti's work)

Independent works
 Trunakankanamu (Grass Bracelet)
 Andhravali (Andhra Row)
 Kashta Kamala (Kamala in Distress)
 Ramyalokamu (Beautiful Sight)
 Swapnakumaramu Telugutoata (Telugu Garden)
 Vanamala (Forest Necklace)
 Misra Manjari (Mixed Bouquet)
 Kannepatalu (Virgin Songs)
 Jadakutchulu'' (Braid Tassels)

References

External links
 Complete Telugu text of Trina Kamkanamu at Andhra Bharati.com
 Ye Desamegina by Sri Rayaprolu Subba Rao
 All India Radio Interview by Sri Rayaprolu Subba Rao
 Desha Bhakthi Geetalu from Sri Rayaprolu Subba Rao
  Telugu Culture - Sankranti Sambaram about Sri Rayaprolu Subba Rao
 Ye Srilu Pongina Jeevagadda by Sri Rayaprolu Subba Rao
 Aduio and Videos of Sri Rayaprolu Subba Rao
 Meetings about Sri Rayaprolu Subba Rao
 Telugu Movie Songs adopted from Sri Rayaprolu Subba Rao works
 Hans India about Sri Rayaprolu Subba Rao
 about Sri Rayaprolu Subba Rao
 Andhravali by Sri Rayaprolu Subba Rao
 Indian Express about Sri Rayaprolu Subba Rao
 Books About Sri Rayaprolu Subba Rao
 Books about Sri Rayaprolu Subba Rao
 Books about Sri Rayaprolu Subba Rao
 By the President of India quoting Sri Rayaprolu Subba Rao in World Telugu Conference

Writers from Andhra Pradesh
Telugu-language lyricists
People from Guntur district
Telugu writers
1892 births
1984 deaths
Recipients of the Sahitya Akademi Award in Telugu
20th-century Indian musicians